Chhibaiya is a large village in Allahabad district, Uttar Pradesh, India.
Chhibaiya is large and populated village near shrine Aindri devi shakteepeeth.

References

Villages in Allahabad district